Queretana 200 is a NASCAR Toyota Series race.

Winners

Records

Most wins

Winning manufacturer

References

NASCAR Mexico Series races
NASCAR races at Autódromo de Quéretaro